Singles are people not in a committed relationship.

Singles may also refer to:

Film and television
 Singles (miniseries), a 1984 Australian television series
 Singles (1992 film), written and directed by Cameron Crowe
 Singles (2003 film), a South Korean film starring Jang Jin-young
 S1ngles, a Greek TV series
 Singles (TV series), a British sitcom produced from 1988 to 1991

Music
 Single (music), a type of music release usually having only one to three songs
 Singles is a frequent title for a compilation album
 Singles (Alison Moyet album)
 Singles (Deacon Blue album)
 Singles (Future Islands album)
 Singles (Jimmy Eat World album)
 Singles (Luna Sea album) (1997)
 Singles (Maroon 5 album) (2015)
 Singles (New Order album)
 Singles (Nirvana box set)
 Singles: Original Motion Picture Soundtrack to the 1992 film
 Singles (Red Krayola album) (2004)
 Singles (Suede album)
 "Singles" (The Long Blondes album), an album by The Long Blondes
 Singles (The Smiths album)
 Singles (Travis album)
 Singles (Despina Vandi album)
 Singles (The UA Years), an album by The Stranglers
 The Singles (Corey Hart album)
 Singles (Fishbone album)
 Singles 1–12, an album by The Melvins
 "Singles", a song by E-40 and Too $hort from History: Function Music
 "Singles", a song by Ibeyi from their self-titled album

Gaming
 Singles: Flirt Up Your Life, a video game by Rotobee
 Singles (cards), individual trading cards sold at hobby stores

Sports
Men's singles or Women's singles in sports having one player per side, including;
 tennis
 badminton
 pickleball
 professional wrestling
 squash
 table tennis
 match play in golf
 Single skating, a figure skating discipline commonly known as "singles"
 Single (baseball), when a batter reaches first base due to successful contact with the ball

Food
 Kenco Singles, a single-serve coffee brewing system
 Kraft Singles, a brand of individually packaged cheese slices

Other uses
 Singles, Puy-de-Dôme, a commune of the Puy-de-Dôme département, France
 United States one-dollar bills, particularly when requesting change from, or implicitly comparing to, larger denomination bills

See also 
 Single (disambiguation)
 Singles match (disambiguation)

es:Singles